Ogilbyina novaehollandiae, the multicolour dottyback, is a species of ray-finned fish from the family Pseudochromidae, the dottybacks from the Western Central Pacific where it is confined to the Great Barrier Reef. This fish occasionally makes its way into the aquarium trade.

References

Pseudochrominae
Taxa named by Franz Steindachner
Fish described in 1879